Xiangnan Tuhua, or simply Tuhua, is a group of unclassified Chinese varieties of southeastern Hunan.
It is spoken throughout most of Yongzhou prefecture (apart from Qiyang County in the northeast) and in the western half of Chenzhou prefecture, in which Xiangnan dialects of Southwestern Mandarin are also spoken.
There is likely significant non-Chinese influence such as Yao, and it may even have started out as Sinicized Yao.

Xiangnan Tuhua is the language of nüshu, the "women's script" of Jiangyong County in Yongzhou.

References

External links 
Miyake, Marc. 2014. A dip into white waters. (Parts 1-4, 5-8, 9-10). [Xiangnan Tuhua historical phonology]

Chinese-based pidgins and creoles
Yao people